OpenWire is a binary protocol designed for working with message-oriented middleware. It is the native wire format of ActiveMQ.

External links
ActiveMQ - OpenWire
How C# - OpenWire

Message-oriented middleware
Network protocols